Stylochaeta is a genus of gastrotrichs belonging to the family Dasydytidae.

The species of this genus are found in Europe.

Species:

Stylochaeta fusiformis 
Stylochaeta longispinosa 
Stylochaeta scirtetica 
Stylochaeta stylifera

References

Gastrotricha